Rattlesnake Point is a summit located in the Brady Mountains in central Texas. It is located entirely in McCulloch County.

References

External links
 

Mountains of Texas
Landforms of McCulloch County, Texas